L'Idalma, ovvero chi la dura la vince (Idalma, or whoever perseveres wins) is an opera by Bernardo Pasquini to a libretto by . It premiered on 6 February 1680 at the Teatro Capranica, Rome.

Recording
L'Idalma, Arianna Vendittelli, Anita Rosati, Margherita Sala, Juan Sancho, Rupert Charlesworth, Innsbrucker Festwochen Orchester, Alessandro De Marchi CPO, DDD, recorded 2021, released 2022

References

Operas
1680 operas
Italian-language operas